is a Japanese talent agency and advertising agency headquartered in Uchi-Kanda, Chiyoda, Tokyo. It was found in 1997 under Aoyama Mainland, a real estate development group, and focuses on talent management for actors, Japanese idols, fashion models and tarento.

The company headquarters changed locations several times, originating in Roppongi to currently stationed in Chiyoda.

Notable talents

Oversea talents 
Representing agency in Japan only
 Block B
 Fly to the Sky
 Myname
 Ryu Si-won
 Sung Si-kyung

Idols/models/tarento 

 Manami Hashimoto
 Haruka Katayama (former AKB48)
 Jurina Matsui (former SKE48)
 Mariya Nagao (former AKB48)
 Ruy Ramos (former Japan national football team player)
 Haruna Yabuki

Former notable talents 

 Chisato Amate
 Takako Inoue
 Jung Woo-sung
 Shinobu Kandori
 Hiromitsu Kanehara
 Kazutomo Miyamoto
 Hitomi Nishina
 Park Hyun-bin
 Kwon Sang-woo
 Seo In-guk
 Super Beaver

References

External links 

 Official website

Talent agencies based in Tokyo
Mass media companies established in 1997
Mass media companies based in Tokyo
Entertainment companies of Japan
Japanese companies established in 1997
Japanese talent agencies